GE HealthCare Technologies Inc., trading as GE HealthCare, is a global medical technology company headquartered in Chicago, Illinois. It was spun-off from GE on January 4, 2023, with GE retaining 20%. As of 2017, it is a manufacturer and distributor of diagnostic imaging agents and radiopharmaceuticals for imaging modalities used in medical imaging procedures. It offers dyes used in magnetic-resonance-imaging procedures; manufactures medical diagnostic equipment, including CT image machines; MRI, XRAY; Ultrasound; Cath Labs; Mammogram; Nuclear Medicine Cameras; and develops Health technology for medical imaging and information technologies, medical diagnostics, patient monitoring systems, disease research, drug discovery, and biopharmaceutical manufacturing. It was incorporated in 1994 and operates in more than 100 countries.

On November 9, 2021, General Electric announced it would demerge into three investment-grade public companies, GE HealthCare being one of the three planned divestitures. GE HealthCare was spun-off on January 4, 2023, with the company being listed on the Nasdaq Stock Market.

History

19th century
In 1893, C.F. Samms and J.B. Wantz founded the Victor Electric Company in a basement. By 1896 they made electrostatic generators for exciting X-ray tubes and electrotherapeutic devices.
They had a staff of six and a capital of $3,000 invested in the company.

Victor Electric
plunged into the X-ray business and by 1896 (one year after Roentgen’s discovery) were making X-ray machines. The business grew rapidly and so, in 1896, moved into new premises three times the original size, but this did not solve the space problems and the company made 3 moves by 1899.

Victor Electric had competitors. In 1896, G.A.Frye began making X-ray tubes, which in 1897 was purchased by Swett & Lewis as the first merger in the X-ray business.

20th century
During the first years, it was easier to keep up with the competition than space requirements. By 1903, Victor Electric had outgrown its facilities at 418 Dearborn St. in Chicago and bought two floors of a building at 55 Market Street, Chicago. This was again only a temporary stop; by 1910 it was too small and the firm moved again in 1911 to a building at the corner of Jackson Blvd. and Damen Avenue. This was the first permanent home of Victor Electric Co. They stayed there 35 years and during this time, gradually acquired all the space in the building and several around it.

During the first 20 years of the X-ray business, many new names appeared. In 1901 the Western Electric Coil Co. was formed. In 1902 MacAlaster & Wiggin purchased the X-ray tube business of Swett & Lewis. Two other companies were the Radio Electric Co., which was later to be known as Snook-Roentgen Manufacturing and the Scheidel Western X-Ray Coil Co. In 1907, Homer Clyde Snook introduced the Snook apparatus, the first interrupterless device produced for X-ray work. The Snook apparatus was manufactured in England.

In 1916, the first significant merger took place, Scheidel Western, Snook-Roentgen, MacAlaster & Wiggin, and Victor Electric Co. were merged with Victor, the surviving name. Victor's two founders had key roles in the new firm; C.F.Samms was company president and J.B.Wantz was Vice-President of manufacturing and engineering.

Four years later, in 1920, a second major merger was accomplished when Victor was acquired by General Electric
which was, at that time, the foremost manufacturer of X-ray tubes.

The marriage of Victor Electric and General Electric became complete of July 28, 1926 when Victor was declared a wholly owned affiliate of General Electric. The merger brought renewed vitality to the organization and Victor entered the foreign market with equipment sold and serviced in nearly 70 countries. In 1930, the name was changed from Victor to General Electric X-Ray Corporation.

World War II saw the dramatic use of X-rays in industry for non-destructive testing of war materials. It also saw the broad use of X-rays as a medical tool for military services.

As the war ended, GE X-Ray Corporation continued to grow. Greater production capacity and greater expertise was needed in the core business of building X-ray tubes. Since the tubes were made from hand-blown glass, the decision was made to move the company 90 miles north to Milwaukee, Wisconsin, in order to tap into the enormous amount of glass-blowing talent in Milwaukee's beer-brewing industry. The company moved from Jackson Blvd. in Chicago to a  site in the city of West Milwaukee, which had been used for building turbochargers during the war. The street in front was renamed Electric Avenue, and the General Electric X-Ray Corporation had a new home in 1947.

In 1951, the corporate structure was dissolved and the name changed to General Electric X-Ray Department. This new name lasted less than 10 years as the department divested itself of its industrial X-ray business, widened its medical business, and took on the name of GE Medical Systems Department. One of the reasons for the name of Medical Systems was due to the increase in the electro-medical business, which began in 1961 with the introduction of patient monitoring equipment. By 1967 modular equipment was developed which was soon popular in cardiac and intensive care units. Early in 1960, pacemakers were developed in Corporate Research & Development in Schenectady, New York, and in 1969 the Standby Pacemaker was developed.

In 1968, the Biomedical Business Section opened its first factory in Edgerton Avenue. Late in 1970 a surgical package was introduced and in 1971, equipment to monitor blood gasses during surgery was introduced.

Later in 1971, Biomedical opened a 9,000 square meter admin and engineering building opposite its factory and in 1972, the section was renamed The cardio-Surgical Product Section. With the growth of its medical business, the General Electric Company upgraded the department to The Medical Systems Division in 1971. Also in 1971, a major expansion programme was started and the Waukesha factory was planned. Work started in July 1972, and was completed in 1973.

In 1973, work on CT was started and eventually the first CT machine was installed in 1976. Development continued to the first CT 8800, and after long negotiations, GE acquired the medical division of EMI Group Ltd. in late 1980 soon after the 1979 takeover of EMI medical division by Thorn Electric company.
The American Anti-Trust Authorities stopped the takeover in the USA however, and the EMI factory in Chicago was bought up by Omni-Medical, who continued to make CTs for a number of years.

Meanwhile, back at GE, the Patient Monitoring Department was sold off in 1981. The initial boost provided by the EMI takeover turned into the doldrums as Reaganomics sent the US dollar soaring, so in 1984 GE bought a 49% share of YMS (Yokogawa Medical Systems), a Japanese company.

In 1983, GE Medical started investing heavily in Magnetic Resonance Imaging (MRI) technology, investing nearly 1 billion US dollars in a new plant in Waukesha, and the MR Signa was born, which would go on to become the very successful MR model range. The magnet plant in Florence (USA) was opened a short time later, giving GE its own magnet production. In the same year, GE divested its dental X-ray division to form Gendex Dental Systems.

In 1985 GE acquired Technicare from Johnson and Johnson.  Originally named Ohio Nuclear (and in 1979, after another fusion, Ohio Nuclear Unirad), the name was changed to Technicare in 1982. Technicare (with headquarters in Cleveland, Ohio) had been producing a range of rotate-stationary CTs with an installed base in the thousands, as well as some X-ray diagnostic equipment and a nascent MRI product range.

Up to this time, the medical Systems Division had simply been divided into domestic and international, but in 1987 it was decided to re-organize into the three "poles" of America, Europe and Pacific. In 1988, GE Medical Europe merged with CGR (a medical equipment supplier based in France) to form General Electric CGR Medical Systems. The European headquarters were moved from Hammersmith (UK) to Buc near Paris.

In 1992, GE had a setback after long negotiations to buy Picker International, who were a major producer of CT and MR equipment.  The deal was not approved by the American authorities, and so GE just bought the Picker Service organization in the U.K., leaving the rest of Picker intact.

In 1994, it was decided to change the name in Europe from GE-CGR back to General Electric Medical Systems. At the close of 1998, GE Medical acquired the Nuclear and MR businesses of Elscint, (then a division of Elron, based in Haifa, Israel), the CT business being bought by Picker, and in the same year Marquette Medical Systems became a wholly owned subsidiary of GE Medical. In 1998, GE medical bought Diasonics Vingmed Ltd. from Elbit Medical Imaging (of Haifa, Israel), thus expanding its ultrasound imaging business. In late 2000, GE bought out the remaining 50% of the ELGEMS joint-venture formed with Elscint in 1997.

21st century
In 2001, GE Medical Systems acquired San Francisco, CA, based CT maker Imatron, Inc for $210 million. Imatron produced an Electron beam tomography (EBT) scanner that performs imaging applications used by physicians specializing in cardiology, pulmonology and gastroenterology. The formal Imatron business was later incorporated into GE HealthCare's Diagnostic Imaging business segment. In early 2002, GE HealthCare had acquired MedicaLogic (creator of the former Logician, an ambulatory Electronic Medical Records system) for approximately $32 million.
By Jan 2003, GE acquired Millbrook Corporation, maker of Millbrook Practice Manager, a billing and scheduling system for doctors' offices.
GE HealthCare IT would later merge the two products into one, although the stand-alone EMR product is still available and in development. Also in April 2002, GE HealthCare completed the acquisition of Visualization Technology, Inc., Boston, MA; a manufacturer of intra-operative medical devices and related products for use in minimally invasive image guided surgery.
In 2003, GE HealthCare acquired Instrumentarium (including its Datex-Ohmeda division), a producer, manufacturer, and supplier of anesthesia machines and mechanical ventilators. To satisfy regulatory concerns in the United States and in Europe, GE HealthCare was forced to divest Instrumentarium's Ziehm Imaging mobile C-arm business, as well as its Spacelabs patient-monitoring unit. Currently, GE HealthCare owns 80% of all anesthesia machines in the United States and 60% of the machines in the world. The former Instrumentarium business was incorporated into GE HealthCare's Clinical Systems business segment.In 2004, the former Amersham plc business segments were separated into the GE HealthCare Medical Diagnostics and Life Sciences business segments and 1 May 2013, both the business were combined again under the GE Life Sciences brand with Kieran Murphy taking the leadership role. Also in 2004, GE HealthCare along with other healthcare companies built a research reactor for neutron and unit cell research at GE's European Research Center near Garching (outside of Munich), Germany. It is the only such reactor currently in operation. In 2005, Sir William Castell, CEO of GE HealthCare and former CEO of Amersham plc stepped down as CEO to become Chairman of the Wellcome Trust—a charity that fosters and promotes human and animal research—in the United Kingdom. Former GE Medical Systems CEO Joe Hogan became the overall CEO for the GE HealthCare business. In 2005, Dental Imaging operations were separated from GE HealthCare. The PaloDEx Group Oy was founded and continues the business with its subsidiaries Instrumentarium Dental and SOREDEX. Specifically, Instrumentarium Dental continues the brands Orthopantomograph and intraoral systems FOCUS and SIGMA, formerly known as Instrumentarium Imaging or GE HealthCare products.
In September 2005, GE HealthCare and IDX Systems Corporation announced that they entered into a definitive, $1.2 billion merger agreement for GE to acquire IDX, a leading healthcare information technology (IT) provider. The acquisition was completed in January 2006. IDX was folded into GE HealthCare Integrated IT Solutions, which specializes in clinical information systems and healthcare revenue management.

On 4 February 2008, GE HealthCare announced that it had completed the acquisition of Whatman plc (LSE:WHM), a global supplier of filtration products and technologies at 270p per share in cash for each Whatman share, valuing Whatman at approximately £363 million (approximately $713 million.) In July 2008, Joseph Hogan announced his intent to leave his post as CEO of GE HealthCare to take the role of CEO at ABB. On July 17, 2008, GE HealthCare announced John Dineen had been chosen to replace outgoing CEO Joseph Hogan. Mr. Dineen had been head of GE's Transportation division since 2005. On March 24, 2010, GE HealthCare announced acquisition of MedPlexus. In late April, 2010, GE HealthCare announced it was investing €3 million in the Technology Research for Independent Living Centre (TRIL). The Irish centre seeks to enhance independence for elderly people through technological innovation.

In July 2015, GE HealthCare partnered with the 2015 CrossFit Games to provide athletes with mobile imaging equipment.

In January 2016, it was announced GE HealthCare's global headquarters will move to Chicago effective early 2016.

In June 2017, GE announced Kieran Murphy as the new CEO of GE HealthCare, with former CEO John Flannery's appointment as CEO of GE.

In April 2018, GE announced the sale of several healthcare information technology assets for $1.05 billion to Veritas Capital.

In June 2018, GE announced plans to spin off GE HealthCare into its own company, representing the conglomerate's efforts to shrink and focus more on the aviation, power and renewable energy sectors. The plan was put on hold after selling the biopharma business to Danaher Corporation for $21.4 billion.

In January 2020, GE announced Mahesh Palashikar As New President, CEO of its south Asia division. In November of the same year the business announced it would acquire Prismatic Sensors AB.

In 2021, GE started a collaboration with Spectronic Medical to create AI-based software. In September the business announced it would acquire BK Medical from Altaris Capital Partners for $1.45 billion.

On November 9, 2021, the company announced it would demerge into three investment-grade public companies, GE HealthCare being one of the three planned divestitures. The spin-off of GE HealthCare happened on 4 January 2023.

In February 2023, it was announced GE HealthCare has acquired the San Mateo-headquartered AI medical technology manufacturer, Caption Health, for an undisclosed sum.

Criticism

Gadolinium-based contrast agents 
In 1994, GE HealthCare ignored advice of its safety experts to proactively restrict the use of its MRI contrast Omniscan and tried to conceal evidence of its risks by telling its researchers to "burn the data", as revealed during a trial opposing debilitated consumers due to its accumulation in multiple organs.

In 2009, GE HealthCare sued for defamation a radiologist at the University of Copenhagen Hospital who linked the uses of Omniscan to gadolinium induced fibrosis after 20 of his patients (from which 1 died) suffered from it after its administration.

in 2017, GE HealthCare opposed the EMA suspending the use of Omniscan (along other linear agents), despite evidence of the high cytotoxicity of gadodiamide and its likelihood to dissociate after deposition.

In a 2020 study, their other MRI dye, Clariscan, was retained more in the cerebrum, cerebellum, kidney and liver of rats than those injected Dotarem, its original drug. Although the authors didn't provide a possible explanation, differences in the chelation process of gadolinium ions (Guerbet's process being patented) or quality assurance could be causes of increased retention in vivo.

Other 
According to The Independent, the firm has received more money back in tax benefits (£1.6 million) in the UK over the past 12 years than it has paid in. Its UK operations are all ultimately owned by a holding company in the Netherlands.  Tax paid was £250,000, 1.7% of its £14.3m profit.  The group employs 22,000 people in the UK.

It supplies a cloud-based imaging system to the East, Midlands Radiology Consortium, which was described in October 2017 as breaking down, so that medical images had to be sent between hospitals by taxi.

Operations 
GE HealthCare has a range of products and services that include medical imaging and information technologies, electronic medical records, medical diagnostics, and patient monitoring systems. GE HealthCare consists of 9 primary business units:
 Detection and Guidance Solutions (DGS), led by 
 devices for X-ray, bone densitometry and digital mammography.
 Healthcare Digital, headquartered in Chicago, Illinois, USA.
 Healthcare Digital provides clinical & financial information technology such as departmental IT products, RIS/PACS (Radiology Information Systems/Picture Archiving and Communication Systems), CVIS (Cardiovascular Information Systems), Cloud based products as well as revenue cycle management and practice applications.  The GE Health Cloud is their latest AWS based cloud offering with case exchange and multi-disciplinary teams (MDT) capabilities. Additional internal co-development partnerships include protocol management and automated protocol selection capabilities.
Former IDX, GE HealthCare's IT business will have its global headquarters in Barrington, Illinois, with major offices in South Burlington, Vermont; Boston; Seattle; and London, along with satellite offices both within and outside the United States.
 Life Care Solutions (LCS), led by Thierry Leclercq, headquartered in Milwaukee, Wisconsin, USA.
 Provides tools for critical care, ECG, anesthesia delivery, neonatal intensive care, labor & delivery, preoperative and home care.
 Magnetic Resonance (MR), led by Jie Xue, headquartered in Waukesha (near Milwaukee), Wisconsin, USA
 Provider of magnetic resonance (MR) imaging systems.
 Molecular Imaging & Computed Tomography (MICT), led by Jean-Luc Procaccini, (previously Michael J. Barber) headquartered in Waukesha (near Milwaukee), Wisconsin, USA.
 Provides computed tomography (CT), positron emission tomography (PET) and molecular imaging technologies.
 Surgery, headquartered in Salt Lake City, Utah, USA.
 Provides tools and technologies for cardiac, surgical and interventional care, from cardiac catheterization labs, diagnostic monitoring systems, data management systems to mobile fluoroscopic imaging systems, navigation and 3D visualization instrumentation.
 Ultrasound (US), led by Roland Rott.
 Produces ultrasound products for general imaging, cardiology, women's health, point of care and primary care, as well as related IT tools.
 Global Services, led by Luiz Verzegnassi, headquartered in Greater Milwaukee Area, WI, USA.

While it has offices around the globe, GE HealthCare has major regional operations in Buc (suburb of Paris), France; Helsinki, Finland; Kraków, Poland; Budapest, Hungary; Yizhuang (suburb of Beijing), China; Hino & Tokyo, Japan, and Bangalore, India.

Its biggest R&D center is in Bangalore, India, built at a cost of $500 million.

References

External links

LinkedIn Page
Facebook Page
Twitter Page

Companies based in Buckinghamshire
Companies listed on the Nasdaq
Amersham
Manufacturing companies based in Chicago
Electronics companies of the United States
 
Health care companies established in 2004
Magnetic resonance imaging
Medical technology companies of the United States
Pharmaceutical companies of the United States
Radiopharmaceuticals